Elections in India in 2020 will include by-elections to the Lok Sabha, elections to the Rajya Sabha for 73 Seats, elections to state legislative assemblies of 3 states and numerous other by-elections to state legislative assemblies, councils and local bodies.

Legislative assembly elections

Parliamentary Bye-election

Assembly Bye-elections

Chhattisgarh

Gujarat

Haryana

Jharkhand

Karnataka

Madhya Pradesh

Manipur

Nagaland

Odisha

Telangana

Uttar Pradesh

See also
 2020 Indian Rajya Sabha elections
 2019 elections in India
 2021 elections in India

References

External links

 Election Commission of India

 
Elections in India by year